Micah 5 is the fifth chapter of the Book of Micah in the Hebrew Bible or the Old Testament of the Christian Bible. This book ostensibly contains the prophecies attributed to the prophet Micah, and is a part of the Book of the Twelve Minor Prophets.

Text
The original text was written in the Hebrew language. This chapter is divided into 15 verses in English Bibles, but only 14 verses in Hebrew Bible (Masoretic Text) using a different verse numbering (see below).

Verse numbering
There are some differences in verse numbering of this chapter in English Bibles and Hebrew texts:

This article generally follows the common numbering in Christian English Bible versions, with notes to the numbering in Hebrew Bible versions.

Textual versions
Some early manuscripts containing the text of this chapter in Hebrew are of the Masoretic Text tradition, which includes the Codex Cairensis (895), the Petersburg Codex of the Prophets (916), Aleppo Codex (10th century), Codex Leningradensis (1008).

Fragments containing parts of this chapter were found among the Dead Sea Scrolls, including 4Q81 (4QXIIf; 175‑50 BCE) with extant verses 1–2; 4Q82 (4QXIIg; 25 BCE) with extant verses 6–7(8); and Wadi Murabba'at Minor Prophets (Mur88; MurXIIProph; 75-100 CE) with extant verses 1–2, 6–15.

There is also a translation into Koine Greek known as the Septuagint, made in the last few centuries BCE. Extant ancient manuscripts of the Septuagint version include Codex Vaticanus (B; B; 4th century), Codex Alexandrinus (A; A; 5th century) and Codex Marchalianus (Q; Q; 6th century). Some fragments containing parts of this chapter in Greek were found among the Dead Sea Scrolls, that is, Naḥal Ḥever 8Ḥev1 (8ḤevXIIgr); late 1st century BCE) with extant verses 1-6(7).

The coming Messiah

Verse 1

"Daughter" refers to the "city".

Verse 2

Christian exegesis
This verse is cited in Matthew 2:6.
 "Beth-lehem Ephratah" —, or, Beth-lehem Judah; so called to distinguish it from Beth-lehem in Zebulun. It is a few miles southwest of Jerusalem. Beth-lehem means "the house of bread"; Ephratah means "fruitful": both names referring to the fertility of the region.
 "Ephratah" (Ephrathah, or Ephrath), "fruitfulness," is another name for Bethlehem, "House of bread" (Ruth 1:2); from its position it is also called Bethlehem Judah (Matthew 2:1), being situated in the tribal lot of Judah, about five miles south of Jerusalem. Septuagint, κιὰ σὺ Βηθλεὲμ οῖκος Ἐφραθά τοῦ Ἐφραθά Alex.
 "Be little among the thousands of Judah": is best translated, "too little to be among the thousands of Judah". Each tribe was divided into "thousands," which would be equivalent to clans, with its own head.
 "Out of thee shall he come forth to me that is to be ruler in Israel" - (Literally, shall (one) come forth to me "to be ruler.") Bethlehem was too small to be any part of the polity of Judah; out of her was to come forth One, who, in God's Will, was to be its Ruler. The words to Me include both of Me and to Me. Of Me, that is, by My Power and Spirit," as Gabriel said, "The Holy Spirit shall come upon thee, and the power of the Highest shall overshadow thee, therefore also that Holy Thing which shall be born of thee, shall be called the Son of God" . To Me, as God said to Samuel, "I will send thee to Jesse the Bethlehemite; for I have provided Me a king among his sons" . So now, "one shall go forth thence to Me," to do My Will, to My praise and glory, to reconcile the world unto Me, to rule and be Head over the true Israel, the Church. He was to "go forth out of Bethlehem," as his native-place; as Jeremiah says, "His noble shall be from him, and his ruler shall go forth out of the midst of him" ; and Zechariah, "Out of him shall come forth the cornerstone; out of him the nail, out of him the battle-bow, out of him every ruler together" . Before, Micah had said "to the tower of Edar, Ophel of the daughter of Zion, the first rule shall come to thee;" now, retaining the word, he says to Bethlehem, "out of thee shall come one to be a ruler." "The judge of Israel had been smitten;" now there should "go forth out of" the little Bethlehem, One, not to be a judge only, but a Ruler.
 "To be ruler in Israel": That is, to be King and Sovereign in Israel, the whole Israel, spiritually or in reality, that Christ the Lord in the midst of them Micah 4:7.

See also

Related Bible parts: Micah 4, Matthew 2

Notes

References

Sources

External links

Jewish
Micah 5 Hebrew with Parallel English
Micah 5 Hebrew with Rashi's Commentary

Christian
Micah 5 English Translation with Parallel Latin Vulgate

05